Theophilus "Fay" Harper (14 July 1866 – 1950) was an English footballer who played in the Football League for Notts County, with whom he was on the winning side in the 1894 FA Cup Final.

References

1866 births
1950 deaths
English footballers
Association football defenders
English Football League players
Mansfield Town F.C. players
Notts Rangers F.C. players
Notts County F.C. players
FA Cup Final players